Nafteh (also Romanized as Nafţeh) is a village in Kabud Gonbad Rural District, in the Central District of Kalat County, Razavi Khorasan Province, Iran. At the 2006 census, its population was 152, in 38 families.

References 

Populated places in Kalat County